Serbia officially has competed at the European Athletics Championships since 2006. Before Serbia has competed as part of SFR Yugoslavia and Serbia and Montenegro.

Outdoor

List of Medalists

As part of Yugoslavia

Indoor

List of Medalists

As part of Yugoslavia

U23

List of Medalists

Junior

List of Medalists

As part of Yugoslavia

Cross Country

List of Medalists

Senior

U23

Junior

References 
 Athletics Federation of Serbia

 
Nations at the European Athletics Championships
Athletics in Serbia